Länsi-Savo is a Finnish language morning broadsheet newspaper published in Mikkeli, Finland.

History and profile
Länsi-Savo was established in 1889. The paper has its headquarters in Mikkeli. The publisher is Etelä-Savon Viestintä which also publishes Itä-Savo.

Länsi-Savo had a circulation of 25,704 copies in 2008. The circulation of the paper was 22,352 copies in 2013.

References

External links

1889 establishments in Finland
Newspapers established in 1889
Finnish-language newspapers
Daily newspapers published in Finland